Sphenostemon is the genus of small evergreen trees or shrubs native to New Guinea, Queensland (Australia) and New Caledonia. They have opposite or spiral leaves, and at most small stipules. The small flowers, borne in terminal inflorescences, have free (i.e. unjoined) sepals and petals. The anthers have thick filaments. The fruit, a berry, is fleshy and contains two seeds. The genus is described as "particularly poorly known".

Taxonomy
In the 2009 APG III system, the genus is placed in the family Paracryphiaceae, along with Paracryphia and Quintinia. The earlier APG II system placed it alone in family Sphenostemonaceae.

References

Asterid genera
Paracryphiales
Taxa named by Henri Ernest Baillon